McGhee House may refer to:

Orsel and Minnie McGhee House, Detroit, Michigan, listed on the National Register of Historic Places (NRHP) in Detroit
C.L. and Bessie G. McGhee House, Franklinton, North Carolina, NRHP-listed
Person-McGhee Farm, Franklinton, North Carolina, NRHP-listed

See also
McGee House (disambiguation)
McGehee House (disambiguation)